The King Edmund School is a coeducational secondary school and sixth form located in Rochford, Essex, England. It is a specialist BEC and applied learning college.
It teaches a variety of subjects including: modern foreign languages, hospitality, technology, performing arts, business studies, humanities, social sciences, law as well as the core subjects including: Maths, English and Science. The Sixth Form is mixed with Year 12 and 13 students.

History
Established in 1961, the King Edmund school was formed by the merging of the Wakering secondary school, and the Rochford secondary school located at the schools current site.

The school converted into an academy in July 2011.

In 2012, the school celebrated its 50th anniversary with a community fun day and exhibition.

In 2022 a former teacher who worked at King Edmund school, a Mr Bobby Rudd, who was the Head of Music was jailed for a series of child sex offences

Academics
In the academic year 2014/2015; 52% of students achieved five GCSE grades at A* to C, 67% of A level students achieved three A level grades of A* to E.

As of 2022, the school's most recent inspection by Ofsted was in 2019, with a judgement of Requires improvement.

Notable former pupils
Keith Huewen - former motorcycle racer now TV sports broadcaster
Mike Penning - MP for Hemel Hempstead

References

External links

penning4hemel.com

Academies in Essex
Secondary schools in Essex
Specialist applied learning colleges in England
Specialist business and enterprise colleges